McDonough Power Equipment, Inc. v. Greenwood, 464 U.S. 548 (1984), was a case decided by the Supreme Court of the United States that established a standard for challenging a verdict based on inaccurate answers given by prospective jurors during voir dire.

Background 
Bill Greenwood was a juvenile in Kansas whose feet were severed on a riding lawnmower manufactured by McDonough. Before the three-week trials, one of the jurors failed to disclose that her son had sustained a broken leg as a result of an exploding tire.  Although McDonough would likely have used a peremptory challenge if they had known the background, there was no direct conflict of interest and the rest of the jurors quickly ruled against the manufacturer in deliberations.

Decision 
The standard adopted by the Court in McDonough was that a verdict could be challenged because of inaccurate answers given during voir dire only if the juror failed to honestly answer a question and an honest answer would have provided a valid basis for a challenge for cause.

See also
List of United States Supreme Court cases, volume 464

References

External links
Full text of the opinion at Justia.com

United States Supreme Court cases
United States civil procedure case law
1984 in United States case law
Lawn mowers
Product safety
United States Supreme Court cases of the Burger Court